Thomas Steu (born 9 February 1994) is an Austrian luger. He competed in the men's doubles event at the 2018 Winter Olympics.

References

External links

1994 births
Living people
Austrian male lugers
Olympic lugers of Austria
Lugers at the 2012 Winter Youth Olympics
Lugers at the 2018 Winter Olympics
Lugers at the 2022 Winter Olympics
Medalists at the 2022 Winter Olympics
Olympic medalists in luge
Olympic silver medalists for Austria
Olympic bronze medalists for Austria
Sportspeople from Vorarlberg
People from Bludenz